Margarita Suero Furcal (born June 16, 1982 in Santo Domingo) is a female beach volleyball and volleyball player from the Dominican Republic, who competed for her native country at the 2001 FIVB Junior Volleyball World Championship in Santo Domingo, Dominican Republic wearing the number #4 jersey. There her team ended up in the 9th place.

Career
In beach volleyball she won the silver medal at the 2006 National Championship and later that year represented her home country at the 2006 Central American and Caribbean Games partnering Rosa Medrano and finishing in 6th place.
She won two times the silver medal in the women's competition at the NORCECA Beach Volleyball Circuit 2007 in Guatemala City and Carolina, Puerto Rico, playing with Bethania Almánzar.
In indoor volleyball, She signed with the Division 2 (Second Division) Spanish team Nuchar Tramek Murillo for the 2007/2008 season, helping it to climb to Liga FEV for 2008/2009 and then to Superliga 2 for the 2009/2010 season.

Returning to the sand, and playing with the experienced Spanish beachvolley player Clara Lozano she won the Torneo de Logroño 2009.
Playing with Nuchar Tramek Murillo, she won with her team the Superliga 2 Princess Cup in 2010.

Clubs
  Paraiso (1997)
  Naco (1998–2000)
  Los Cachorros (2001–2004)
  Liga Juan Guzman (2005)
  Modeca (2006)
  Nuchar Tramek Murillo (2007–2010)

Awards

Beach Volleyball

National Team
 National Championship 2006  Silver Medal
 NORCECA Beach Volleyball Circuit Guatemala 2007  Silver Medal
 NORCECA Beach Volleyball Circuit Puerto Rico 2007  Silver Medal

International
 2009 Logroño Beach Volleyball Tournament -  Gold Medal

Clubs
 2005 Dominican Republic Distrito Nacional Superior Tournament -  Runner-Up, with Liga Juan Guzman
 2007/2008 Spanish Women's Second Division -  Champion, with Nuchar Tramek Murillo
 2008/2009 Spanish Women's Liga FEV -  Runner-Up, with Nuchar Tramek Murillo
 2010 Princess Cup Superliga 2 -  Champion, with Nuchar Tramek Murillo

References

External links
 BV Database Profile
 FIVB Profile

1982 births
Living people
Sportspeople from Santo Domingo
Dominican Republic women's volleyball players
Dominican Republic beach volleyball players
Women's beach volleyball players
Wing spikers
Expatriate volleyball players in Spain
Dominican Republic expatriate sportspeople in Spain